Freeze, Melt is the sixth studio album by Australian electronic music band Cut Copy. It was released on 21 August 2020 by Cutters Records and The Orchard. The album was produced by the band leader, Dan Whitford. Freeze, Melt spawned three singles: "Love Is All We Share", "Cold Water" and "Like Breaking Glass".

Background
The album was written over three years, after Dan Whitford had relocated to Copenhagen, Denmark, and recorded in nine days in Park Orchards, Victoria, just outside Melbourne. The first song created for the album was "Cold Water". Musically, the material is a departure from Cut Copy's previous, more dance-oriented style and turns towards ambient music. The more introspective nature of the album is a result of Whitford's life in a Scandinavian country.

Release and promotion
On 8 May 2020, Cut Copy released the single "Love Is All We Share". It was followed by the second single, "Cold Water", on 26 June 2020, along with the announcement of the album release. The third single preceding the album, "Like Breaking Glass", was released on 5 August 2020. All songs from the album were accompanied by visualisers created by Takeshi Murata and Christopher Rutledge.

In August, the band announced a tour in Europe for spring 2021.

Reception

Freeze, Melt received mixed to favourable reviews from professional music critics upon its initial release. At Metacritic, which assigns a normalised rating out of 100 to reviews from mainstream publications, the album received an average score of 69, based on 8 reviews, indicating "generally favorable reviews". At AnyDecentMusic?, it scored 6.4 out of 10 points.

In a positive review for AllMusic, Tim Sendra acclaimed Freeze, Melt as Cut Copy's "most inward looking and sparsely constructed work to date" and "a daring move for the band". Writing for Clash magazine, Josh Crowe concluded that it is "as meticulous as it is melancholy, which is what makes it so profoundly personal and universal at the same time". In a more critical review in the Slant Magazine, the album was described as "intriguingly knotty but a bit self-defeating".

Track listing

Charts

References

2020 albums
Cut Copy albums
The Orchard (company) albums